Jae Rhim Lee (born 1975 in Gwangju, South Korea) is an artist and TED Fellow working at the intersection of art, science, and culture. Lee aims to promote "acceptance of and a personal engagement with death and decomposition" by breeding a unique strain of mushroom that promotes environmentally friendly tissue decomposition upon death.

She earned a B.A. degree in psychology from Wellesley College (1998) and an M.S. degree in visual studies from the Massachusetts Institute of Technology (2006).

Infinity Burial Project
According to Lee, human bodies accumulate a large amount of toxins during their lifetime. Upon death, whether the body is cremated or buried, these toxins are released back into the environment.  The fungi have been chosen for their potential to utilize the nutrients in human tissue and to remediate industrial toxins in soil. Once realized, the "Infinity Mushroom" will be applied to the other components of the project.

The mushrooms can be adapted to grow on the artist's own collected hair, nails and skin. Eventually, a body suit will be developed that the deceased is wrapped in, which will promote decomposition.

The journalist has explained that small mushroom structures with a cap and stipe are found in several groups of ascomycetes, for example, the fruitbodies of Cordyceps, Vibrissea, and Mitrula, and the club-shaped earth-tongues. Though similar in appearance to these fungi, the very small fruitbodies of Onygena species differ in that the cap surface breaks into a powdery spore mass at maturity. The two most common species are O. corvina, which occurs on owl pellets, bird carcasses, hair, and wool, and O. equina, found on the decaying horns and hooves of cattle and sheep. Onygena corvina reaches at most 2.5 cm (1 in.) in height, and has a whitish stalk and an ocher to light brown cap. These fungi are widely distributed but infrequently collected because of their small size and occurrence on animal remains, which are avoided by most mushroomers.

FEMA Trailer Project
The FEMA trailer project was exercised in 2003. At that time, New Orleans had the Hurricane Katrina, so the government supplied FEMA trailers as shelters to many homeless people. However, people recognized that the FEMA trailers created formaldehyde, a bad chemical gas, which can cause respiratory problems. Although the government gave them other shelters to live in, surplus trailers have been keeping producing formaldehyde. Therefore, Jae Rhim Lee and the team for environmental justice were asked to find a good way for solving the problem of FEMA trailers. She put on many plants on the toxic soils on the surplus trailers, which can relieve soil erosion and purify formaldehyde.

References

External links
 Jee Rhim Lee's homepage
 MIT homepage
 
 Jee Rhim Lee's TED personal profile
 "My mushroom burial suit" (TEDGlobal 2011)

1975 births
Living people
American artists
People from Gwangju
Wellesley College alumni
Massachusetts Institute of Technology alumni